The Nieuport 15 (or Nieuport XV in contemporary sources) was a French World War I bomber aircraft. Due to disappointing performance the type was rejected and never entered service.

Design and development
Scaled up from the Nieuport 14, the new bomber was built in the summer of 1916 and the first prototype was ready for testing in November of that year.

The Nieuport 15 was a two-bay sesquiplane with V-struts and a newly designed tailplane including a heart shaped elevators. It was powered by a  Renault 12F V-12 engine. with Hazet modular radiators mounted on each side of the fuselage.

During limited flight testing the controls and landing gear were found to be unsatisfactory and the French quickly abandoned the bomber. In December 1916 it was declared obsolete but the British showed some interest and had ordered 70 aircraft but after the tests proved disappointing, all orders were eventually cancelled.

Specifications

See also

References

Citations

Bibliography

 015
Military aircraft of World War I
1910s French bomber aircraft
Sesquiplanes
Single-engined tractor aircraft
Aircraft first flown in 1916